Pedavalasa is a village and a Mandal in Visakhapatnam district in the state of Andhra Pradesh in India.

Geography
Pedavalasa is located at 17.8667N 82.3500E. It has an average elevation of 839 meters (2755 feet).

Legislative assembly
Pedavalasa is an assembly constituency in Andhra Pradesh.

List of Elected Members:
1967 - D.K.Rao.

References 

Villages in Alluri Sitharama Raju district